Mapum is a village located east of Ukhrul in Ukhrul district, Manipur state, India.

Total population 
According to 2011 census, Mapum has 251 households with the total of 1117 people of which 562 are male and 555 are female. Of the total population, 53 were in the age group of 0–6 years. The average sex ratio of the village is 988 female to 1000 male which is higher than the state average of 985. The literacy rate of the village stands at 77.16.40% which is higher than the state average 76.94%. Male literacy rate stands at 84.96% while female literacy rate was 69.36%.

References

Villages in Ukhrul district